Coprinellus is a genus of mushroom-forming fungi in the family Psathyrellaceae. The genus was circumscribed by the Finnish mycologist Petter Adolf Karsten in 1879. Most Coprinellus species were transferred from the once large genus Coprinus. Molecular studies published in 2001 redistributed Coprinus species to Psathyrella, or the segregate genera Coprinopsis and Coprinellus.

In 2020 Phylogenetic analysis conducted by the German mycologists Dieter Wächter & Andreas Melzer reclassified many Coprinellus species as belonging to the new genus Tulosesus.

Species 

, Index Fungorum accepted 62 species of Coprinellus. In recent years many species were added to the genus having mostly been moved from Coprinus whilst numerous species were removed and placed in the genus Tulosesus in 2020. One species was moved to the monotypic genus Punjabia. The total number of accepted species has not changed greatly from the 66 in 2019 however many species have been moved. Due to the significant changes to this genus recently many old synonyms are likely to still be in use. 

Many of these species appear similar and require microscopic analysis to differentiate and identify.

Former Species
These species were reclassified as Tulosesus in 2020.

See also 
 Tulosesus
 Punjabia

References

 
Agaricales genera
Taxa named by Petter Adolf Karsten
Taxa described in 1879